The 1570s BC Is A Decade That began on January 1, 1579 BC, And Ended On December 31, 1570 BC.

Events and trends
 1570 BC—The Second Intermediate Period of Egypt ends and the New Kingdom of Egypt begins. 
 1572 BC—The death of Moses, according to Thrasyllus of Mendes, an Egyptian mathematician and astronomer who lived in the reign of Tiberius

Significant people
 Kamose, last Pharaoh of the Seventeenth Dynasty of Egypt (1573–1570 BC).
 Ahmose I, Pharaoh and founder of the Eighteenth Dynasty of Egypt (1570–1546 BC).
 1573 BC—Death of Eber, son of Salah (b. 2037 BC) according to the Hebrew calendar